Radaan Mediaworks is an Indian production house based in Tamil Nadu, and founded by Radikaa Sarathkumar.

Early history
Radaan began as a proprietary business in 1975 and subsequently converting into a corporate entity in 1999.

Subsidiary
Radaan Mediaworks was formed in 1998 and based in Tamil Nadu and is making a range of television serials and movies for Sun TV, Gemini TV, Udaya TV, Surya TV, KTV, ETV, Zee TV, Shakthi TV, Vasantham and Star Vijay

Upcoming projects

Current productions

Past productions

Tamil serials

Telugu serials

Malayalam serials

Kannada serials
Hogli Beedi Sir (2002-2003) - Udaya TV
Lakshmi (2007-2008) - Udaya TV
Lakshmi Jhansiye Magalu (2008-2010) -  Udaya TV
Chikkamma (2010-2011) - Udaya TV

Game shows

Web series

Films

References

External links
  Official Website

Companies based in Tamil Nadu
Mass media companies established in 1999
Television production companies of Tamil Nadu
1999 establishments in Tamil Nadu